This list is for television series that have been produced by France and are adapted from one or more series originally produced in a country besides France. For original live action French series, see: List of French television series, and for original animated series from France, see: List of French animated television series.

Comedy

Comedy-Drama

Game Show

Police/Crime Drama

Reality Show

See also 
 Cinema of France
 Culture of France
 List of French television series
 List of French animated television series
 List of French-language films
 Lists of French films

References

Adaptations of television series from other countries

Lists of works based on television shows
Television shows remade overseas
F